Akala may refer to:
 ʻĀkala or Rubus hawaiensis,  a species of flowering plant endemic to Hawaii
 Akala (rapper), British rap and hip hop artist
 Akala, Bhulath, a village in Bhulath Tehsil in Kapurthala district of Punjab State, India

See also
 Akela (disambiguation)